Anthony Hugh Leigh Trimmer (born 24 January 1943) is a British former racing driver from England, who won the Shell British Formula Three Championship and E.R. Hall Trophy in 1970. He was born in Maidenhead, Berkshire.

Tony Trimmer also won the prestigious Monaco F3 Race in 1970 driving a Brabham BT-28 and finished runner-up to Patrick Depailler in the 1972 edition.

Trimmer entered six Formula One World Championship Grands Prix with uncompetitive teams, firstly Maki for four races in 1975 and 1976, resulting in four failures to qualify. He then entered the 1977 British Grand Prix (failed to pre-qualify) and the 1978 British Grand Prix (failed to qualify), with the Melchester Racing Team, driving a Surtees TS19 and a McLaren M23 respectively. However, also driving the Melchester McLaren, he finished a superb third in the rain-soaked 1978 BRDC International Trophy non-Championship race at Silverstone, coming home ahead of many of the greats of Formula One. That year he won the British Aurora F1 Championship.

Trimmer was also one of the few people to drive the Connew Formula One car, in its last race (in later Formula 5000
specification) in 1973. However the car collided with a barrier at Brands Hatch after a rear damper gave way.

Other than World Championship races, Trimmer raced in many non-championship F1 races and is perhaps one of the drivers who drove the greatest variety of Formula One cars ever. The list includes the great Lotus 72 at the 1971 Race of Champions, the March 701, a Lotus 49, Fittipaldi F8 and the one-off Safir RJ-02 (a.k.a. Token RJ-02), accessing from the old times "tubby" Lotus 49 up to a real wing-car Fittipaldi F8.


Racing record

Complete Formula One World Championship results
(key) (Races in bold indicate pole position; races in italics indicate fastest lap)

Non-Championship results
(key) (Races in bold indicate pole position; races in italics indicate fastest lap)

Complete European F5000 Championship results
(key) (Races in bold indicate pole position; races in italics indicate fastest lap.)

Complete Shellsport International Series results
(key) (Races in bold indicate pole position; races in italics indicate fastest lap)

Complete British Formula One Championship results
(key) (Races in bold indicate pole position; races in italics indicate fastest lap)

Complete European Formula Two Championship results
(key)

Complete 24 Hours of Le Mans results

Complete World Endurance Championship results
(key) (Races in bold indicate pole position) (Races in italics indicate fastest lap)

Footnotes

References

English racing drivers
English Formula One drivers
British Formula One Championship drivers
British Formula Three Championship drivers
British Formula 3000 Championship drivers
People from Maidenhead
24 Hours of Le Mans drivers
1943 births
Living people
Maki Formula One drivers
World Sportscar Championship drivers